María Fernanda Malo (born November 19, 1985), also known as Fuzz, is a  Mexican film and television actress, best known for her role in the telenovela Rebelde.

Biography
Malo was born in Cancún, Quintana Roo, Mexico.

Malo later in 1989 moved to Mexico City, where she started her acting career.

Malo played many different roles on Mexican soap operas until 2005, when she was cast in a minor role in the film Efectos Secundarios (2006).

After the success of Efectos Secundarios''', Malo was cast in a remake of Hasta el viento tiene miedo (2007), starring Martha Higareda.

FilmographyComo dice el dicho (2013).... RebecaMiss XV (2012) Alma de Hierro (2008) .... LoreHasta el viento tiene miedo (2007) .... JessicaEfectos Secundarios (2005) .... JossieRebelde (2004) TV Series .... Sol de la Riva (2005–2006)El Juego de la vida (2001) TV Series (as Marifer Malo) .... Marisol RoblesLa Casa en la Playa (2000) TV Series .... TaniaLa Culpa (1996) TV Series .... LulúEn Carne Propia'' (1991) TV Series .... Estefanía

References

External links
 

1985 births
Living people
Mexican film actresses
Actresses from Quintana Roo
People from Cancún
Mexican telenovela actresses
21st-century Mexican actresses